Joseph Kenneth Shovlin (June 30, 1902 – April 14, 1974), known as Michael Whalen, was an American actor who starred in B Movies and television, including Son of a Badman and Wee Willie Winkie.

Selected filmography

References

External links

 
 

American male television actors
Actors from Wilkes-Barre, Pennsylvania
American male film actors
Male actors from Pennsylvania
1902 births
1974 deaths
20th-century American male actors